The 22nd African Championships in Athletics was held in Saint Pierre, Mauritius from 8 to 12 June 2022, at the Cote d'Or National Sports Complex. The event was originally scheduled to be held in 2020 in Oran, Algeria, but had to be cancelled due to the COVID-19 pandemic.

Medal summary

Men

Women

Mixed

Medal table

References

External links
Official site
Results

 
African Championships in Athletics
2022
African Championships in Athletics
International athletics competitions hosted by Mauritius
African Championships in Athletics